The birthplace of the great twelfth-century poet Jayadeva has been disputed, with the neighboring states of Odisha and West Bengal in eastern India staking a claim. This had led to a bitter feud between people on both sides that lasted for over a century. The issue is still debated by scholars.

Odia view

Protagonists of the Odia viewpoint point out that all of Jayadeva's composition took place when the poet was in Puri, supporting the idea that he must have lived in Puri for most, if not all of his life. Archaeological discoveries in Odisha establish Jayadeva's extended presence in Odisha. There also exists a village called Kenduli Sasan in Odisha where the Hindu deity Krishna, who was also the main theme in Jayadeva's works, has traditionally been worshipped as the main god. Coincidentally, the inhabitants of that village also worship Jayadeva. A Sasan is a name for villages that traditionally were centers of Brahmin scholarly activity in Odisha, and Jayadeva himself was a Brahmin.

Furthermore, researchers opine that Jayadeva is among the central-most figures in Odia culture. Jayadeva's works, they observe, have spread to southern India, but are rare in neighboring Bengal. It has been pointed out that the Gita Govinda's influence outside Odisha is most felt in the southern states of Andhra Pradesh, Kerala and Tamil Nadu, where verses of the poet's work have been incorporated into the Kuchipudi, Kathakali and Bharatanatyam classical dance forms respectively. It is Jayadeva's ashtapadis that are sung in dance performances of Odissi, the classical dance of Odisha. Odia bhajans (devotional songs) and traditional Odissi Music are based on ragas and talas specified by Jayadeva's hymns. Jayadeva was a devotee of Krishna, and Krishna in the form of Jagannath is the central deity of Odisha, whereas the female deity Durga is prominent in Bengal. The Gita Govinda composed by Jayadeva is one of the popular themes in the traditional patachitra paintings of Odisha. In stark contrast, according to Thomas Donaldson, an American specialist on Indian art history, Jayadeva's ragas do not match the lyrical patterns of Bengal, which unlike Odisha, does not even possess a classical vocal tradition. The lack of correlation between Bengali traditional music and the compositions of Jayadeva were independently observed in Barbara Stoler Miller's book, Love Song of the Dark Lord. Additionally, a highly Sanskritized and sophisticated classical culture had been firmly entrenched in Odisha during that period, while neighboring Bengal only had a folk based culture until recent times.

Archaeological evidence
Supporters of Odisha as his birthplace, including the Odisha state government, argue that the archaeological records, including temple inscriptions, palm manuscripts and lithographs of that era have revealed the poet's Odia origin. The worship of the Hindu deity, Krishna, in the form of Jagannath was widespread in Odisha during Jayadeva's birth. On the other hand, they argue that there is no archaeological evidence of such worship in Bengal until the arrival of Chaitanya, which was over three centuries after the era of Jayadeva. Inscription at the Lingaraj temple in Bhubaneswar tells us that Jayadeva had been a member of the teaching faculty of the school at Srikurmapataka, near Puri in Odisha. The inscriptions, that refer to "Sadhu Pradhana Jayadeva" were carved by the Odisha monarch of that period. Later discoveries of inscriptions at the Madhukeswar and Simhachal temples, also in Odisha, are believed to establish the linkage between Jayadeva and the dancing families of Kurmapataka, who held sway during the reign of the Odishian monarch Chodagangadeva.

Evidence based on medieval manuscripts

Furthermore, scholars maintain that accounts by numerous medieval authors, such as Chandra Dutta of Mithila and Navaji of Gwalior supports Odisha as the poet's birthplace. The poet Mahipati of Maharashtra writes in his book Bhakti Vijaya, that Jayadeva's native village was very close to Puri. The Assamese text, Sampradaya Kula Dipak as well as the Telugu text, Sanskruta Kabi Jivani, contain elaborate descriptions of the poet's birth taking place near the Jagannath Dham in Utkala (Odisha). Another book, Vaishnava Leelamruta by Madhaba Patnaik who lived in the sixteenth century and was contemporaneous to Chaitanya, clearly mentions that the poet was born near Puri.

Some further details about Jayadeva have been garnered from Madhaba Patnaik's book. It gives a clear account of Chaitanya's visit to Puri.  He mentions that Chaitanya paid a visit to Kenduli Sasan near Puri to pay homage to Jayadeva and to chant passages from the Gita Govinda.  The book mentions that Kenduli Sasan was in fact the birthplace of the illustrious poet.  Madhava Patnaik's book also gives an account of Jayadeva's early life from the legends around Puri.  It mentions Jayadeva as excelling in the Shastras and the Puranas (sacred Hindu texts) from early childhood.

Evidence from Jayadeva's own writings 
Historians now suggest that some of the poet's own compositions in Odia unequivocally support the idea that Jayadeva belonged to Puri, Odisha. Jayadeva mentions his birthplace as "Kendubilva by the sea" ("Kendubilva Samudra Sambhava") in his 7th Ashtapadi, and Birbhum, unlike Puri, does not abut on the sea. Jayadeva used to bathe each morning in the banks of a river, mentions the book Bhaktamala. A. K. Tripathy, an eminent scholar on Jayadeva, and P. C. Tripathy point out that the poet could never have walked daily to the river Ajeya which is 36 miles away from the Bengali village, unlike the Prachi river upon whose banks is situated the Kenduli village near Puri. Jayadeva's hymns refer to the ocean using the Sanskrit word "Mahodadhi", which is a typical name given to the sea in Puri. None of Jayadeva's compositions remotely suggest that he ever served in the court of any monarch. Besides, Lakshman Sena ruled Birbhum between 1179 AD and 1185 AD, that was just about a few years after birth of the poet.

The Bengali view
A few earlier accounts by Bengali writers had linked Jayadeva to the famous king of Bengal Lakshman Sen, the fourth ruler of the Sena dynasty and the last Hindu ruler of unified Bengal.
These views originated from a single Bengali book, Jayadeva Charita authored by Odia poet called Banamali Das, then subsequently disseminated by Bengali historians. The book was written in 1803 when little was known about the poet's life.  Since this was the only published source of information then, it eventually came to be accepted that Jayadeva may have been born in Bengal. This idea was further propagated in 1906 through an article by a certain M. M. Chakrobarty where he mentioned that the great poet belonged to Bengal in the Asiatic Society of Bengal. Since Jayadeva mentions the village of Kendubilva as his birthplace, a location in Birbhum, where a traditional Baul festival is held each year, was identified to have been the original Kenduli village of Jayadeva. Under the assumption that the illustrious poet was born there, that festival too became associated with Jayadeva. A nearby village acquired the sobriquet of "Jayadeva Kenduli" and became a tourist attraction, and the Baul festival was renamed as "Jayadeva Mela"
Jayadeva lived for a long time in Navadwip during the reign of the king of Bengal, Lakshman Sen, making his home not far from the king's palace. At that time, the king's chief scholar was Govardhan Acharya. According to Ashutosh Deb's Bengali dictionary, Jayadeva was Lakshman Sen's court poet.
 
Shrila Bhaktivinoda Thakur writes in his Navadvipa-dhama-mahatmya that Lakshman Sen was delighted when he heard Jayadeva's hymn to the ten incarnations, the Dasavatara-stotra. When Govardhan Acharya notified the king that it was Jayadeva who had composed the hymn, he became desirous to meet the poet. He went incognito to Jayadeva's house and when he saw him, he noticed that Jayadeva possessed all the characteristics of a great and powerful spiritual personality. In spite of having originated centuries later during the time of Chaitanya. Also The Krishna worshipping was prevailing in Bengal from long time before Sri Chaitanya.In the Gaudiya Vaishnava Abhidhana, it is stated that Jayadeva found his Radha Madhava Deities in this river's waters. It is also stated there that he used to rest and worship at the Temple of Shiva known as Kusheshwar, which is also on the banks of the Ajaya River.

Since Jayadeva's composition, including the Gita Govinda clearly were composed in Puri in Odisha, Bengali historians who supported the idea that Jayadeva must have been from that state, went on to explain that the poet eventually settled in Puri in that state where he began composing poetry.

Sikh encyclopedist Kahn Singh Nabha writes in his Encyclopedia Mahan Kosh (1926) that Jayadev was born in Kendooli, dist. beerbhumi Bengal.

The Kaun Banega Crorepati faux pas
The April 16, 2007 episode of the popular Indian TV game show Kaun Banega Crorepati (KBC III) mentioned Jayadeva as the court poet of king Lakshmanasena of Bengal. This triggered an immediate volley of protests by the culture-aware people of Odisha. Shah Rukh Khan, the game show's host was denounced for spreading false information. The government of Odisha has also demanded an apology from Kaun Banega Crorepati as it claims that the game show "mutilated historical facts" and "hurt the feelings of the people of Odisha". The Jayadeva Foundation Trust launched a protest against the TV show. Some scholars have expressed concern over the false depiction of Jayadeva's origin by Kaun Banega Crorepati, which they call a "historical humbug".

Postage stamps commemorating Jayadeva's birth in Odisha
In July 2009, the government of India's Department of Posts has decided to release 11 stamps in Bhubaneswar to commemorate the birth of Jayadeva. One stamp depicts the poet himself, while the other ten show the 10 incarnations of Vishnu, or Dasavatara, that the poet popularized in his epic poem, the Gita Govinda. Chief Minister Naveen Patnaik unveiled the stamps at a special function in Jayadev Bhawan. The stamps are in the denomination of Rs 5. A total of 800,000 stamps were released for sale in Odisha.

See also

 Kenduli Sasan
 Jaydev Kenduli

References 

Jayadeva
Indian literature
Controversies in India
Birthplaces